Salem is a city in and the county seat of Marion County, Illinois, United States. The population was 7,282 at the 2020 census.

Geography 
Salem is located in central Marion County at  (38.6282, -88.9482). U.S. Route 50 passes through the city center as Main Street, leading east  to Flora and west  to Carlyle. Illinois Route 37 (Broadway) crosses US 50 in the center of town, leading north  to Alma and south  to Dix. Interstate 57 passes through the west side of Salem, with access from Exit 116 (US 50); the Interstate leads northeast  to Effingham and south  to Mount Vernon.

Town Creek flows through the east side of the city, running to Crooked Creek just south of the city limits. Via Crooked Creek, Salem is part of the Kaskaskia River watershed.

Climate

History
Salem was formerly a sundown town. For decades, Salem had signs on each main road going into town telling African Americans that they were not allowed in town after sundown.

Demographics 

At the 2000 census there were 7,909 people in 3,249 households, including 2,082 families, in the city. The racial makeup of the city was 97.13% White, 0.72% African American, 0.30% Native American, 1.15% Asian, 0.04% Pacific Islander, 0.14% from other races, and 0.52% from two or more races. Hispanic or Latino of any race were 0.72%.

Of the 3,249 households, 28.6% had children under the age of 18 living with them, 48.8% were married couples living together, 11.0% had a female householder with no husband present, and 35.9% were non-families. 32.3% of households were one person and 17.2% were one person aged 65 or older. The average household size was 2.32 and the average family size was 2.91.

The age distribution was 23.5% under the age of 18, 8.7% from 18 to 24, 26.1% from 25 to 44, 22.1% from 45 to 64, and 19.6% 65 or older. The median age was 39 years. For every 100 females, there were 87.6 males. For every 100 females age 18 and over, there were 83.9 males.

The median household income was $34,339 and the median family income was $42,070. Males had a median income of $31,811 versus $21,931 for females. The per capita income for the city was $16,954. About 6.1% of families and 9.2% of the population were below the poverty line, including 13.2% of those under age 18 and 9.2% of those age 65 or over.

Education 
Public schools:
 Salem Community High School
 Salem Elementary School District 111, which is split into two separate schools:
 Hawthorn, a Kindergarten through 3rd grade school.
 Franklin Park, a 4th through 8th grade school.
 Selmaville Elementary School

Notable people 

 Jim Bredar, basketball player for 1950-51 Illinois team that reached NCAA basketball tournament's Final Four; born in Salem
 Charles W. Bryan, 20th and 23rd governor of Nebraska; younger brother of William Jennings Bryan; born in Salem
 William Jennings Bryan, 41st US Secretary of State; US congressman representing Nebraska's 1st district, 3-time U.S. presidential candidate; born in Salem
 Jim Finks, pro football player and executive; attended high school in Salem
 Merle Harmon, sports broadcaster; born in Salem
 Bill Laswell, bassist, producer, and record label owner
 Jess Marlow, television journalist; born in Salem
 Rockette Morton, musician and bassist with Captain Beefheart and The Magic Band
 John T. Scopes, science teacher who defended the teaching of evolution against William Jennings Bryan in Dayton, Tennessee, at the Scopes Trial
 Morrie Steevens, pitcher for Chicago Cubs and Philadelphia Phillies; born in Salem
 Erastus D. Telford, Illinois state senator and lawyer

Arts and culture 

Salem is home to four buildings on the National Register of Historic Places: the Charles and Naomi Bachmann House, the Badollet House, the William Jennings Bryan Boyhood Home, and Grace Methodist Church.

President Franklin D. Roosevelt delivered an address on May 3, 1934, dedicating a statue of William Jennings Bryan created by Gutzon Borglum. The statue originally stood in Washington, D.C. but was displaced by highway construction in 1961 and moved to Salem, Bryan's birthplace, with formal Congressional approval in 1974.

References

External links

 
 Salem Chamber of Commerce
 Salem History Links

Cities in Marion County, Illinois
Cities in Illinois
County seats in Illinois
Sundown towns in Illinois